Lewis Mayo may refer to:
 Lewis Mayo (politician) (1828–1907), American politician
 Lewis Mayo (footballer) (born 2000), Scottish footballer